The 2019 season is Helsingin Jalkapalloklubi's 111th competitive season.

Season Events

New contracts
On 30 November 2018, Faith Obilor signed a new contract until the end of the 2019 season.

On 8 February, Kevin Kouassivi-Benissan signed a new contract until the end of the 2020 season, with an option for an additional year.

On 22 February, Nikolai Alho signed a new contract until the end of the 2019 season.

On 15 March, Riku Riski signed a new contract until the end of the 2021 season.

On 17 June, Santeri Väänänen signed a new contract until the end of the 2021 season.

Squad

On loan

Transfers

In

Loans in

Out

Loans out

Released

 Pirinen's move was announced on the above date, but was not active until 1 January 2019.

Trial

Friendlies

Competitions

Veikkausliiga

The 2019 Veikkausliiga season begins on 3 April 2019 and ends on 3 November 2019.

Regular season

Results summary

Results by matchday

Results

European Playoff

Finnish Cup

Sixth Round

UEFA Champions League

Qualifying rounds

UEFA Europa League

Qualifying rounds

Squad statistics

Appearances and goals

|-
|colspan="14"|Players from Klubi-04 who appeared:
|-
|colspan="14"|Players away from the club on loan:

|-
|colspan="14"|Players who left HJK during the season:

|}

Goal scorers

Disciplinary record

Notes

References

2019
HJK
HJK